Gol Khandan-e Jadid (also Romanized as Gol Khandān-e Jadīd and Golkhandān-e Jadīd) is a village in Gol Khandan Rural District, in the Bumehen District of Pardis County, Tehran Province, Iran. At the 2006 census, its population was 197, in 49 families.

References 

Populated places in Pardis County